The 1967 SFR Yugoslavia Chess Championship was the 22nd edition of SFR Yugoslav Chess Championship. Held in Kraljevo, SFR Yugoslavia, SR Serbia, between 20 April and 13 May 1967. The tournament was won by Milan Matulović.

References

External links 
 https://www.chessgames.com/perl/chess.pl?tid=90839
 http://www.perpetualcheck.com/show/show.php?lan=cp&data=Y1967001&job=g1

Yugoslav Chess Championships
1967 in chess
Chess